The 2013 World Rhythmic Gymnastics Championships were held in Kyiv, Ukraine, from August 28 to September 1, 2013 at the Palace of Sports.

Yana Kudryavtseva of the Russian Federation became the youngest individual world all-around champion in rhythmic gymnastics history at the age of 15 years.

The official song of the tournament was "We make this world go!" performed by Ireesha (watch here).

Schedule

28 August 2013 Wednesday
10:00–19:15 Individuals Hoop & Ball alternatively (CI)
20:00–20:30, Individual Final (CIII) Hoop
20:30–21:00, Individual Final (CIII) Ball
Following Award ceremony Hoop
Following Award ceremony Ball
29 August 2013 Thursday
10:00–19:15, Individuals Clubs & Ribbon alternatively (CI)
20:00–20:30 Individual Final (CIII) Clubs
20:30–21:00 Individual Final (CIII) Ribbon
Following Award ceremony Clubs
Following Award ceremony Ribbon

30 August 2013, Friday
14:00–16:00 Individuals All-Around Final Group B (CII) (rank 13–24)
17:00–19:00 Individuals All-Around Final Group A (CII) (rank 1–12)
Following Award ceremony Individuals All-Around
31 August 2013, Saturday
15:00–17:15 10 Clubs and 3 Balls + 2 Ribbons alternatively (CI)
17:45–20:00 10 Clubs and 3 Balls + 2 Ribbons alternatively (CI)
Following Award ceremony Groups All-Around Competition
1 September 2013, Sunday
15:00–15:40 Groups 10 Clubs (CIII)
15:50–16:30 Groups 3 Balls + 2 Ribbons (CIII)
Following Award ceremony Groups 10 Clubs
Following Award ceremony Groups 3 Balls + 2 Ribbons
18:00 Closing ceremony and Gala

Medal winners

* reserve gymnast

Individual

Competitors

  Anna Mpanzu
  Nkumba Francisco
  Lilit Harutyunyan
  Anna Svirina
  Danielle Prince
  Jaelle Cohen
  Natascha Wegscheider
  Nicol Ruprecht
  Lala Yusifova
  Marina Durunda
  Elisabeth De Leeuw
  Katsiaryna Halkina
  Melitina Staniouta
  Natalia Azevedo Gaudio
  Angelica Kvieczynski
  Mariya Mateva
  Silviya Miteva
  Annabelle Kovacs
  Patricia Bezzoubenko
  Valentina Andrea Castro Zumaran
  Valeska Lissette Gonzalez Olivares
  Yuqing Yang
  Senyue Deng
  Mirjana Sekovanic
  Elena Milenkovic
  Pantelitsa Theodoulou
  Themida Christodoulidou
  Monika Mickova
  Sara Mohmed Rostom
  Yasmine Mohmed Rostom
  Natalia Garcia
  Carolina Rodriguez
  Olga Bogdanova
  Viktoria Bogdanova
  Jouki Tikkanen
  Ekaterina Volkova
  Kseniya Moustafaeva
  Lucille Chalopin
  Liana Tsetsadze
  Salome Phajava
  Laura Jung
  Jana Berezko-Marggrander
  Kyriaki Alevrogianni
  Varvara Filiou
  Linda Esperanza Sandoval Maldonado
  Bianka Borocz
  Dora Vass
  Palak Kour Bijral
  Nishtha Shah
  Neta Rivkin
  Victoria Veinberg Filanovsky
  Alessia Russo
  Veronica Bertolini
  Kaho Minagawa
  Sakura Hayakawa
  Aliya Assymova
  Viktoriya Gorbunova
  Yeon Jae Son
  Natalija Janusa
  Jelizaveta Gamalejeva
  Karolina Sklenyte
  Anastasija Grisanina
  Veronica Cumatrenco
  Iuliana Liubomeiscaia
  Cynthia Yasmin Valdez Perez
  Rut Castillo Galindo
  Marie Therese Ruud
  Emilie Holte
  Anna Czarniecka
  Maja Majerowska
  Maria Canilhas
  Carolina Coelho
  Alexandra Piscupescu
  Aimee Van Rooyen
  Grace Legote
  Margarita Mamun
  Yana Kudryavtseva
  Daphne Theresa Chia
  Monija Cebasek
  Mojca Rode
  Giulia Di Lorenzo
  Elisa Cavalli
  Xenia Kilianova
  Anastassia Johansson
  Jennifer Pettersson
  Panjarat Prawatyotin
  Anyavarin Supateeralert
  Elif Zeynep Celep
  Burcin Neziroglu
  Alina Maksymenko
  Ganna Rizatdinova
  Jasmine Kerber
  Rebecca Sereda
  Anastasiya Serdyukova
  Djamila Rakhmatova
  Andreina Acevedo Martinez
  Michelle Steffanie Sanchez Salazar
  Mai Nhat Linh Truong

Qualification
 The top 8 scores in individual apparatus qualifies to the apparatus finals and the top 24 in overall qualification scores advance to the all-around final.
 Only the 3 best results (bold) are counted in the total score.

Hoop

Ball

Clubs

Ribbon

All-Around

Groups

Group compositions

  Beniude Panguleipo
  Margarida Cabral
  Ana Ferreira
  Yolanda Gaspar
  Jandira Henriques
  Milka Kodjo
  Sophia Lindtner
  Anastasiya Detkova
  Daniela Hohl
  Anna Theresa Hosp
  Julia Meder
  Vanessa Nachbaur
  Sabina Garatova
  Sabina Abbasova
  Irada Ahadzade
  Mansura Bagiyeva
  Siyana Vasileva
  Aliya Pashayeva
  Valeriya Pischelina
  Hanna Dudzenkova
  Maryna Hancharova
  Maryia Katsiak
  Aliaksandra Narkevich
  Yana Lukavets
  Debora Andreazi Falda
  Bianca Maia Mendonca
  Gabriela Paixao Ribeiro
  Dayane Amaral
  Beatriz Francisco
  Francielly Machado Pereira
  Hristiana Todorova
  Tsvetelina Stoyanova
  Tsvetelina Naydenova
  Reneta Kamberova
  Mihaela Maevska
  Snezhana Decheva
  Maria Soto Avila
  Daniela Poblete Robles
  Barbara Araya Rubio
  Sara Rojas Munizaga
  Catalina Alexandra Nunez Campusano
  Rocio Caibul Diaz
  Ding Ziyi
  Yang Ye
  Zhao Jingnan
  Zhang Ling
  Zhang Doudou
  Bao Yuqing
  Legna de la Caridad Savon Diaz
  Martha Perez Rodriguez
  Adriana Ramirez Blanco
  Arecnev Isabella Jimenez Osoria
  Zenia Rosa Fernandez Cutino
  Camila Garcia Bravo
  Vendula Zamorska
  Katerina Gerychova
  Veronika Hegrova
  Lenka Siroka
  Anna Sebkova
  Martina Svedova
  Sandra Aguilar
  Artemi Gavezou Castro
  Elena Lopez
  Alejandra Quereda
  Lourdes Mohedano
  Solja Sade
  Jenni Kaita
  Riikka Kangas
  Sonja Kokkonen
  Heleri Kolkkanen
  Aino Purje
  Noemie Balthazard
  Lea Peinoit
  Oceane Charoy
  Elena Chabert
  Julie Marques
  Samantha Ay
  Judith Hauser
  Anastasija Khmelnytska
  Anastasia Kempf
  Sara Radman
  Rana Tokmak
  Daniela Potapova
  Eleni Doika
  Charikleia Smyrli
  Stavroula Samara
  Zoi Kontogianni
  Ioanna Anagnostopoulou
  Blanka Boldizsar
  Csinszka Horvath
  Sarolta Toth
  Nora Zita Raub
  Zsuzsanna Franciska Kun
  Barbara Kiss
  Ekaterina Levina
  Irina Kurzanov
  Shir Hillel
  Ida Mayrin
  Adar Elhaik
  Grace Nehmi
  Valeria Schiavi
  Marta Pagnini
  Andreea Stefanescu
  Chiara Ianni
  Camilla Bini
  Camilla Patriarca
  Midori Kahata
  Airi Hatakeyama
  Rie Matsubara
  Nina Saeedyokota
  Sayuri Sugimoto
  Sakura Noshitani
  Ardak Kumisbayeva
  Nazgul Abduali
  Akbota Kalimzhanova
  Yelena Maryassova
  Viktoriya Pereverzeva
  Zhannet Zhaboyeva
  Kim Hee-ryeong
  Lee Kyung-eun
  Lee Na-young
  Lee Ji-woo
  Yang Hyun-jin
  Nelly Gonzalez Llanos
  Maria Fernanda Castillo Casanova
  Maria Eugenia Nava del Rio
  Cossette Ommundsen G Canton
  Marialicia Ortega Elizondo
  Estefany Sosa Alvarado
  Dagmara Bak
  Zuzanna Klajman
  Aleksandra Kubiak
  Marina Milona
  Patrycja Romik
  Anzhelika Faydevych
  Patricia A. E. Pereira de Silva
  Patricia de Sousa E Silva
  Ana Rita Farinha Barata
  Beatriz M. S. Goncalves Tojal
  Ines Pedro Ventura
  Olga Ilina
  Anastasia Bliznyuk
  Ksenia Dudkina
  Anastasiia Maksimova
  Anastasia Nazarenko
  Elena Romanchenko
  Lisa Tacchelli
  Nathanya Koehn
  Lisa Rusconi
  Nicole Turuani
  Julia Eva Novak
  Stephanie Kaelin
  Oleksandra Aslanyan
  Olena Dmytrash
  Svitlana Prokopova
  Yevgeniya Gomon
  Valeriia Gudym
  Viktoriia Mazur
  Alisa Kano
  Monica Rokhman
  Jennifer Rokhman
  Natalie Mc Giffert
  Sharon Dassouli
  Laura Tutunikov
  Evgeniya Larionova
  Ekaterina Bukhenko
  Zarina Kurbonova
  Olga Kiryakova
  Luiza Ganieva
  Marta Rostoburova

All-Around

10 Clubs

3 Balls + 2 Ribbons

Medal table

References

External links
Official website
Results

2013 in gymnastics
2013 in Ukrainian sport
Gymnastics in Ukraine
2013
2013
2013
2013 Rhythmic Gymnastics World Championships